Madras Gazette was a weekly newspaper published in Madras, Madras Presidency, British India and one of the first in India. Madras Gazette competed with the Madras Courier  for printing Government notifications.

References

Newspapers established in 1795
Publications established in 1795
Publications with year of disestablishment missing
Defunct weekly newspapers
Defunct newspapers published in India
History of Chennai
English-language newspapers published in India
1795 establishments in India
Madras Presidency
Gazetteers of India